Wehe, wenn er losgelassen (lit. "Woe if He is Let Loose") is a 1932 German-Czech comedy film directed by Martin Frič and Karel Lamač. It is a German language version of the Czech film Business Under Distress (1931).

Cast
 Vlasta Burian as Theobald Haselhuhn
 Mabel Hariot as Pussi Angora
 Harry Frank as Georg Schilling
 Friedl Haerlin as Asta, dessen Tochter
 Friedrich Hölzlin as General director Bruckmann
 Karl Forest as Frank Krüge
 Josef Rovenský as Prisoner
 Eugen Jensen as Consul Wieland
 Inge Rahm as Loisi
 Josef Holub as Servant Kampl (as Seff Holub)
 Anny Bondy as Secretary Mana Müller
 Friedl Haerlin as Asta Wielandt
 Jan W. Speerger as Shopkeeper

See also
 Business Under Distress (1931)
 The Dangerous Game (1933)
 Josef the Chaste (1953)

References

External links
 

1932 films
1932 comedy films
1932 multilingual films
German comedy films
Films of the Weimar Republic
1930s German-language films
German black-and-white films
Films directed by Martin Frič
Films directed by Karel Lamač
Czechoslovak comedy films
Czech comedy films
German multilingual films
German films based on plays
1930s German films